Eagles Wing Corporation (sometimes styled as Eagles-Wing, Corp.) was an American aircraft manufacturer based in Normandy, Tennessee and later Morrison, Tennessee. The company specialized in the design and manufacture of powered parachutes in the form of ready-to-fly aircraft for the US FAR 103 Ultralight Vehicles rules.

The company seems to have been founded about 1999 and gone out of business in 2005.

The company marketed one aircraft model, the single-seat Eagles Wing Scout, although a two-seat model was under development since 2003. The two-seat model appears to have never been produced, except one prototype.

Aircraft

References

External links
Company website archives on Archive.org

Defunct aircraft manufacturers of the United States
Ultralight aircraft
Powered parachutes